Isaw is a popular street food from the Philippines, made from barbecued pig or chicken intestines. It is a type of inihaw. The intestines are cleaned, turned inside out, and cleaned again, repeating the process several times; they are then either boiled, then grilled, or immediately grilled on sticks. They are usually dipped in vinegar or sukang pinakurat (vinegar with onions, peppers, and other spices). They are usually sold by vendors on street corners during the afternoons.

See also
Inihaw
 Proben
 Filipino cuisine § Street food and other snacks
 Satay
 Kwek Kwek
 Chitterlings

References

Offal
Street food in the Philippines
Philippine cuisine